The 2007-2008 season was FK Sarajevo's 59th season in history, and their 14th consecutive season in the top flight of Bosnian football.

Players

Squad

(Captain)

Source:

Statistics

Kit

References

FK Sarajevo seasons